Zhangixalus omeimontis is a species of frog in the family Rhacophoridae endemic to China. Its common name is Omei whipping frog or Omei treefrog, in reference to its type locality, Mount Emei  in Sichuan. It is found in southern and central China in Yunnan, Sichuan, Guangxi, Guizhou, Hunan, and Hubei provinces. It is a relatively common frog that inhabits forests, and sometimes farmland. It breeds in still water (pools and ponds). Agriculture and logging are threats to this species.

Description
They tend to be bigger and older at cooler sites (i.e., at higher altitudes). Maximum age is at least eight years.

Reproduction
Zhangixalus omeimontis breed between mid-April and late July. Breeding takes place during night-time. Males arrive before females, climbing in the vegetation close to a pond and calling while perched on stems or leaves. When a male spots an approaching female, it approaches the female and clasps her. The pair then moves to oviposition site above the pond. The female then makes a foam nest while the pair is in amplexus. In addition to the first male, several other males may join, forming a spawning group. The primary male often leaves the female before she has spawned all her eggs.

Clutch size is several hundred eggs, with one study finding a range of 457–837 eggs. Eggs hatch after about 12 to 17 days. The eggs are placed on upper leaf surfaces, facilitating the washing of tadpoles into breeding ponds by rainfall.

References

omeimontis
Amphibians of China
Endemic fauna of China
Taxa named by Leonhard Stejneger
Amphibians described in 1924
Taxonomy articles created by Polbot